The 1998 Women's World Team Squash Championships were held in Stuttgart, Germany and took place from November 9 until November 15, 1998.

Seeds

Results

First round

Pool A

Pool B

Pool C

Pool D

Quarter finals

Semi finals

Third Place Play Off

Final

References

See also 
World Team Squash Championships
World Squash Federation
World Open (squash)

World Squash Championships
1998 in women's squash
W
Squash
Squash tournaments in Germany
International sports competitions hosted by Germany